Clingan may refer to:

33747 Clingan (1999 PK4), a Main-belt Asteroid discovered in 1999
Clingan Jackson (1907–1997), Democratic politician and newspaperman from Ohio
George Clingan (1868–1953), soldier and politician in Manitoba, Canada
Judith Clingan (born 1945), Australian composer, conductor, performer and music educator
Sammy Clingan (born 1984), Northern Ireland international footballer
William Clingan (1721–1790), delegate in the Continental Congress for Pennsylvania from 1777 to 1779